In Dutch mythology and legends, the Witte Wieven (also known as Wittewijven) are spirits of "wise women" (or else elven beings). The mythology dates back at least to the pre-Christian era (7th century) and was known in the present-day regions of the Netherlands, Belgium and parts of France. In some places they were known as Juffers or Joffers ("ladies"), or as Dames Blanches (White Ladies) in French.

Origins
Witte wieven in modern Dutch Low Saxon literally translates to "white women", but originally meant "wise women". "Wit" or "witte" meant wise in a way similar to the English "witty". Witte wieven is still often translated to "white woman", as the words come from the same roots. The association of wise women with the color white was either an accidental translation error, or a symbolic color association for wisdom (sources differ).

Historically, the witte wieven are thought to be wise female herbalists and medicine healers who took care of people's physical and mental ailments. It was said they had the talent for prophecy and looking into the future. They had a high status in the communities, and so when they died ceremonies were held at their grave sites to honour them. 

According to mythology, their spirits remained on earth, and they became living spirits (or elven beings) that either helped or hindered people who encountered them. They tended to reside in the burial sites or other sacred places. It was thought that mist on a gravehill was the spirit of the wise woman appearing, and people would bring them offerings and ask for help. 

While many scholars believe Witte Wieven originated as above from honoring graves of wise women, others think the mythology of witte wieven come from part of the Germanic belief in disen, land wights, and/or alven (Dutch for "elf") for several reasons:  The practice of bringing offerings and asking for help from their graves is very similar to honoring disen, land wights and alfen in Germanic paganism. In addition, in some localities the mythological witte wieven were described directly as "Alfen" or "Alven".

Jacob Grimm mentioned them in the Deutsche Mythologie (1835) as the Dutch variant of the German Weiße Frauen: "The people of Friesland, Drenthe and the Netherlands have just as much to tell of their witten wijven or juffers in hills and caverns ... though here they get mixed up with elvish personages."

Characterization
At first, early medieval literature described the witte wieven more like pranksters and pests. Later Christian teaching transformed the idea of a "witte wieven" into mistflarden (wisps of mist or fog): ghost witches  — recharacterized as evil and to be avoided. 

In certain legends "Alvinne" was a ghost in a white cloak.

Legacy
The following places were named after witte wieven, and report witte wieven legends:

In the Netherlands:
 Near the Village of Eefde is Wittewievenbult: this translates as "White Women Hill". Local legend holds that White Women appear on Christmas Eve every year and dance on this hill.
 Near the Village of Barchem is Wittewijvenkuil: this translates as "White Women Pit". It is a pit between two local hills. Local legend holds that three white women lived there.

See also
 Dames Blanches (White Ladies of French mythology, similar)
 Völva
 Weiße Frauen  (White Women of German mythology, similar)
 White Goddess (book by Robert Graves)
 White women (disambiguation)

Notes

Sources
 Grimm, Jacob (1835). Deutsche Mythologie (German Mythology); From English released version Grimm's Teutonic Mythology (1888); Available online by Northvegr © 2004-2007, Chapter 32, page 3.
 Reginheim. Heathen History of the Achterhoek. 2002. Files retrieved 02-24-2007
 Reginheim. Witte wieven. 2007.  (in English) File retrieved 03-08-2007.

External links
	 
Witte wieven by Varhalen (in Dutch) 	  	
lycos/newpage3 (in Dutch)

Dutch legendary creatures
Female legendary creatures